Aillet is a surname. Notable people with the surname include:

Joe Aillet (1904–1971), American football and basketball coach and college athletics administrator
Marc Aillet (born 1957), French Roman Catholic bishop

See also
Millet (surname)

French-language surnames